The Clyfford Still Museum is an art museum in Denver, Colorado. The Museum's collection includes 3,125 works by abstract expressionist Clyfford Still (1904-1980), which represents 93 percent of the artist's lifetime output and complete archives.

The 28,500-square-foot building opened in 2011 and includes nine galleries, an art studio, visible painting storage areas and conservation lab, two outdoor terraces, archive displays, and outdoor forecourt green space.

History
When Clyfford Still died in 1980, his will stipulated that his entire collection be given to an American city willing to establish a permanent museum dedicated exclusively to the care and display of his art. Approximately 20 American cities contended to receive the Still collection.

In August 2004, Still's wife, Patricia, chose Denver to receive the collection after then-Mayor John Hickenlooper visited her home and agreed to the will's terms. The artworks contained within the Clyfford Still Estate included roughly 825 paintings on canvas and 1,575 works on paper – drawings and limited-edition fine-art prints.

In 2006, the newly formed Clyfford Still Museum secured a parcel of land within Denver's Civic Center Cultural Complex immediately west of the Denver Art Museum’s then-under-construction Frederic C. Hamilton Building, designed by Daniel Libeskind. Later that year, the board selected Allied Works Architecture, led by Brad Cloepfil, for the Museum’s design.

The Museum broke ground on its new home in December 2009 and opened to the public on November 18, 2011  as a single-artist museum.

In 2017, the Museum launched the Online Collection and Research database. More than 2,500 works of art including paintings and works on paper by Clyfford Still are available in high-resolution reproductions in the Online Collection.

Collection
The Clyfford Still Museum collection includes:

 130 paintings from 1920–1943: works from Still’s student years, Depression-era works, Surrealist-inspired works, and first forays into abstraction
 302 paintings from 1944–1960: Still’s “breakthrough period” and the years of “high” Abstract Expressionism
 350 paintings from 1961 to 1979: works from the final two decades of his life, created in rural Maryland
 2,300 works on paper spanning all aspects of Still's career in a wide range of media such as pastel, crayon, charcoal, gouache, tempera, graphite, and pen and ink, and fine art prints in a variety of techniques
 3 carved wood and mixed media sculptures

Exhibitions
The Museum rotates the Clyfford Still Collection on average two to three times per year in themed exhibitions.

The Museum's first exhibition was the Inaugural Exhibition. Other exhibitions include an Artists Select series curated by artists such as Roni Horn, Julian Schnabel, and Mark Bradford, Daughter's Eye/A Daughter's Voice curated by Sandra Still Campbell, and Repeat/Recreate with canvases from the Smithsonian American Art Museum, the Metropolitan Museum of Art, the Hirshhorn Museum and Sculpture Garden, the Modern Art Museum of Fort Worth, the Detroit Institute of Arts, the Museum of Modern Art in New York, and private collections.

The Clyfford Still Museum has also loaned out works for exhibitions in the past.

Archives 
The Museum also houses the complete Clyfford Still Archives (CSA) of correspondence, sketchbooks, journals, notebooks, the artist's library, photo albums, person effects, and other archival materials, inherited upon Patricia Still's death in 2005. Still corresponded with many artists, critics, dealers, museum professionals, and collectors of the Abstract Expressionist era such as Jackson Pollock, Mark Rothko, Clement Greenberg, and Peggy Guggenheim. The archives are open to the public and offer a growing research database.

Funding
The Museum is run by a non-profit organization. A portion of the Museum's funding is provided by a 0.1% sales tax levied in the Scientific and Cultural Facilities District (SCFD), which includes seven Colorado counties (Adams, Arapahoe, Boulder, Broomfield, Denver, Douglas and Jefferson) in the Denver-Aurora metropolitan area.

References

External links
 Clyfford Still Museum Official Website
 Clyfford Still Online Collection
 Clyfford Still Archives

Museums in Denver
Modern art museums in the United States
Contemporary art galleries in the United States
Museums of American art
Art museums established in 2011
Biographical museums in the United States
Museums devoted to one artist